"I Miss U" (stylised in all lowercase) is a song by English DJ and record producer Jax Jones and Antiguan-German singer-songwriter Au/Ra. It was released on 9 October 2020 by Polydor Records. The song peaked at number twenty-five on the UK Singles Chart. It was written by Cass Lowe, Ina Wroldsen, Janée Bennett, Olav Tronsmoen and Timucin Lam.

Background
Tweeting about the meaning behind the song, Jones said, "i miss u is finally out in the world we all miss something right now and i miss u is supposed to highlight that and remind ourselves that it's ok to feel this way sometimes. despite what rishi says 😬 music is more important than ever."

Music video
A music video to accompany the release of "I Miss U" was first released onto YouTube on 9 October 2020.

Personnel
Credits adapted from Tidal. 
 Alex Tepper – producer, associated performer, co-producer, drum programming
 Cass Lowe – producer, composer, lyricist, associated performer, co-producer, programming
 Jax Jones – producer, associated performer, music production, programming
 Mark Ralph – producer, associated performer, co-producer, mixer, programming, studio personnel, vocal producer
 Tom Demac – producer, additional producer, associated performer, drum programming
 Ina Wroldsen – composer, lyricist
 Janée Bennett – composer, lyricist
 Olav Tronsmoen – composer, lyricist
 Timucin Lam – composer, lyricist
 Au/Ra – associated performer, vocals
 Andrew Frampton - vocal production
 Big-z – associated performer, drum programming
 Matthew Styles – mastering engineer, studio personnel
 Torsten Stenzel – studio personnel, vocal engineer

Charts

Weekly charts

Year-end charts

Certifications

References

2020 singles
2020 songs
Jax Jones songs
Au/Ra songs
Song recordings produced by Jax Jones
Song recordings produced by Mark Ralph (record producer)
Songs written by Au/Ra
Songs written by Jax Jones